Tupu Atanatiu Taingakawa Te Waharoa (1844 – 24 June 1929) was a notable New Zealand tribal leader, kingmaker and king movement leader. Of Māori descent, he identified with the Ngāti Hauā iwi. He was born in Maungakawa or Te Tapiri, Waikato, New Zealand, in about 1844. He was the son of Wiremu Tamihana Tarapipipi.

References

1844 births
1929 deaths
People from Waikato
Ngāti Hauā people